Georges Pootmans (born 15 May 1889, date of death unknown) was a Belgian footballer. He played in four matches for the Belgium national football team in 1909.

References

External links
 

1889 births
Year of death missing
Belgian footballers
Belgium international footballers
Association football midfielders
Beerschot A.C. players
Footballers from Antwerp